Bryan Cancel Santiago (born July 14, 1992), better known by his stage name Brytiago, is a Puerto Rican singer and songwriter. He was born in Carolina, Puerto Rico. He started his career in 2014, at age 21. In 2016, when he was 23 years old, he joined El Cartel Records, Daddy Yankee's record company. He has released several songs such as "Bebé", "Lonely", "Punto G", "High", "Abuso", which have all achieved moderate success in Latin countries. In 2018, he released "Bipolar", along with Ozuna and Chris Jeday. The single was a success, and peaked at No. 17 on the Billboard Hot Latin Songs chart.

In 2018, Brytiago released "Asesina" with Darell.  Following the release of the remix featuring Daddy Yankee, Anuel AA, and Ozuna, it would become his first top ten on the Billboard Hot Latin Songs chart.

In February 2019, Brytiago collaborated with Anuel AA for the song "Controla."

Early life
Brytiago taught himself from a young age how to sing and write all his life experiences in lyrics. He developed a unique, genuine and sticky style; with which he brings in his first single "Hay Algo en Ti"; which premiered in July 2014. Just two years after beginning his musical career, he was signed in Daddy Yankee's label El Cartel Records. Brytiago had been a big fan of him since he was very young. On an interview with Billboard, he said: "When I was eight years old, I took a picture with Daddy Yankee like any other fan who grew up listening to his music... But I never imagined that years later I would be signed to his label or that an artist like him would give me support and help me in my career. This is one of the greatest blessings I have received in my life". He later appeared as a guest artist on Daddy Yankee's song "Alerta Roja".

Discography

Albums

Studio albums

Collaborative albums

Extended plays

Singles

As lead artist

Notes
 Note 1: Peak prior to being combined with "Asesina" (Remix)
 Note 2: Uses combined chart entries for "Asesina" and "Asesina" (Remix)

As featured artist

Promotional singles

Other charted and certified songs

Guest appearances

Notes

References 

1992 births
Living people
People from Carolina, Puerto Rico
21st-century Puerto Rican male singers
Puerto Rican reggaeton musicians
Latin trap musicians